Ogbia (AgBeya or Abaya) is the most spoken Central Delta language of Nigeria. It is spoken by over 200,000 people.

Blench (2019) lists varieties as Kolo (Agholo), Oloiḅiri, and Anyama. The Anyama variety remains unattested and has no data.

References

Languages of Nigeria
Central Delta languages